The Garage is a 2006 American independent film written and directed by Carl Thibault.

Plot
A mechanic at his father's garage during the late 1970s, Matt dreams about leaving his small town existence and pursuing grander ambitions. But strong feelings for a new girlfriend and deep family ties may prevent Matt's ultimate escape, despite pressure from best friend Schultz to take off immediately.

Production
The film was shot from October 18, 2004 to October 10, 2005 in Lockhart, Martindale, Red Rock, Richland and Uhland, Texas and Los Angeles, California.

Critical reception
It was shown at over 85 film festivals where it won 20 awards including the Slate Award for Best Director and Best Picture at the California Independent Film Festival.

References

External links

2006 films
2006 independent films
American independent films
2000s English-language films
2000s American films